Timothy Justin Tillman (born 4 January 1999) is a German professional footballer who plays as a midfielder for Major League Soccer club Los Angeles FC.

Club career

Youth career
Tillman began his youth career with ASV Zirndorf, before moving to 1. SC Feucht in 2007. After two seasons, he joined the youth team of Greuther Fürth in 2009. In 2017, he moved from Fürth to the youth academy of Bundesliga club Bayern Munich for a fee of €500,000. Upon his departure, Fürth president Helmut Hack said, "Timothy Tillman is the biggest talent we have had for 30 years. His departure is a catastrophe for our club."

In 2017, he won the 2016–17 A-Junioren Bundesliga Süd/Südwest with Bayern's under-19 team, scoring five goals during the season. The team went on to advance to the final of the A-Junioren Bundesliga championship round, with Tillman scoring in the semi-final second leg against Schalke 04, before losing to Borussia Dortmund 8–7 on penalties.

Bayern Munich
Tillman began his senior career with Bayern Munich II in the 2017–18 season, making his debut in the Regionalliga Bayern on 14 July 2017 in a 5–0 home win against FC Ingolstadt II. He scored his first goal for the reserve team on 13 September 2017, scoring Bayern's second goal in a 2–1 away win against 1. FC Nürnberg II. He finished the 2017–18 season with 31 appearances and 6 goals in the Regionalliga.

1. FC Nürnberg (loan)
On 2 July 2018, Tillman joined Bundesliga club 1. FC Nürnberg on loan for the 2018–19 season. He began his stint at the club with the reserve team, making his debut in the Regionalliga Bayern on 15 September 2018 in a 2–2 home draw against 1. FC Schweinfurt.

Tillman made his professional debut for the first team on 10 March 2019 in the Bundesliga, coming on as a substitute in the 52nd minute for the injured Enrico Valentini in the away match against 1899 Hoffenheim, which finished as a 1–2 loss.

Greuther Furth
Tillman requested a transfer back to his youth club, Greuther Fürth, which was granted by FC Bayern Munich on 3 January 2020.  Both clubs refused to comment on the transfer fee. Tillman made his club debut on 24 September 2021 against Bayern Munich.

Los Angeles FC
On 10 February 2023, Tillman signed a two-year contract with Major League Soccer club Los Angeles FC.

International career

Youth
Tillman is eligible to represent Germany through his mother or the United States through his father. He began his youth international career with Germany, appearing for the under-16 to under-19 selections. He made five appearances for the under-19 side, including three in the qualification for the 2018 UEFA European Under-19 Championship, which Germany failed to qualify for.

In January 2018, it was announced that Tillman would switch to representing the United States internationally. He was to join a United States under-20 training camp in March 2018 under coach Tab Ramos, but still had to submit a formal request to FIFA in order to switch. He instead joined the Germany under-19 team in March 2018, appearing in a match against the Netherlands.

Personal life
Tillman was born in Nuremberg, Germany, to an African-American father, serving in the U.S. Armed Forces, and German mother. However, he was raised by his single mother in Fürth, a city in northern Bavaria, Germany. He holds dual citizenship with Germany and the United States. His younger brother, Malik Tillman, is also a footballer, having also played for the youth teams of Greuther Fürth and Bayern Munich. Malik has also represented the United States and Germany internationally at youth level.

Career statistics

Club

Honors
Bayern Munich
 DFL-Supercup: 2017

References

External links
 
 
 Profile at kicker.de
 

1999 births
Living people
Footballers from Nuremberg
German footballers
Germany youth international footballers
German people of African-American descent
German people of American descent
Association football midfielders
FC Bayern Munich II players
1. FC Nürnberg II players
1. FC Nürnberg players
SpVgg Greuther Fürth players
Los Angeles FC players
Bundesliga players
Regionalliga players